Ugljare or Uglara, is a village in the Gračanica municipality of Kosovo. Ugljare was part of the Kosovo Polje municipality before the Gračanica municipality was created.

It is a Serb enclave; it has a supermajority of ethnic Serbs.

Ugljare is located about 5 kilometers from city center of Pristina and 12 kilometers from the Gračanica monastery. There is river passing through the Ugljare, Prištevka.

Notes

References 

Villages in Gračanica, Kosovo
Serbian enclaves in Kosovo